Yevgeni Mikhailovich Kachan (born 22 March 1983) is a Russian former professional football player.

Club career
He played 10 seasons in the Russian Football National League for 4 different clubs.

References

External links
 

1983 births
Sportspeople from Krasnoyarsk
Living people
Russian footballers
Association football defenders
FC KAMAZ Naberezhnye Chelny players
FC Fakel Voronezh players
FC Metallurg Lipetsk players
FC Yenisey Krasnoyarsk players
FC Sibir Novosibirsk players
FC Volga Ulyanovsk players